Olgun Toker (born 12 March 1986) is a Turkish actor.

Life and career 
Toker was born on 12 March 1986 in Mersin. He studied theatre at the Müjdat Gezen Art Center. He made his debut in 2010 with a role in the movie Saklı Hayatlar and continued his cinematic career with Kurtuluş Son Durak, Hükümet Kadın and Küçük Esnaf.

Toker started his television career in 2012 by appearing in the series Son. He then had recurring roles in Benim Adım Gültepe, Karadayı, Şeref Meselesi and Hayat Şarkısı. His breakthrough came with his role in the 2019 Fox series Bir Aile Hikayesi as Mahur. In 2020, he was cast in a leading role in the drama series Arıza.

Filmography

Film

Television

Streaming films and series

References

External links 
 
 

1986 births
Living people
21st-century Turkish male actors
Turkish male film actors
Turkish male television actors
People from Mersin